James Jefferson Webster Sr. (September 27, 1898 – May 24, 1965) was an American businessman, farmer, and politician. He owned a dairy and tobacco farm, tobacco warehouses, a general store, and co-ran a car dealership in Rockingham County, North Carolina. A Democrat, Webster served as a Rockingham County commissioner for ten years. As a county commissioner, he played a role in the development of North Carolina Highway 135, which was posthumously named after him, and worked on the gubernatorial campaign of W. Kerr Scott.

Biography 
James Jefferson Webster was born on September 27, 1898 in Patrick County, Virginia to James William Webster and Lillie Frances Davis. He was one of six children. The family relocated to Rockingham County, North Carolina where his father was possibly employed in the construction of the Avalon Mill. By the time he was six, Webster was orphaned, and he spent the next few years living with his brothers and other families. On December 24, 1923, he married Nannie Hurt Strong in Martinsville, Virginia and had five children with her: James Jefferson II, Nancy, Anne Margaret, Robert Penn, and John Ray.

In 1927 Webster purchased a wood-built store at the intersection of North Carolina Highway 135 and Settle Bridge Road in Rockingham County and opened J.J. Webster's Store. As the local general store, it served as a gathering point for the Shiloh community. Webster used his position as the store's owner to assist struggling families in the area; he allowed farmers to purchase goods on credit and would wait to call their tab after their tobacco had been sold. Webster was also a tobacco and dairy farmer and operated tobacco warehouses in Stoneville and Clarkton. On May 1, 1937 Webster, together with George Amos Dillon, Robert Smith, and Clyde Smith, opened an Oldsmobile car dealership in a sheet-metal garage building in Madison under the name of W.D.S. Motors, Incorporated. A new W.D.S. Motors building opened on October 5, 1940. In 1955 the wooden J.J. Webster Store building was moved and a brick structure was erected in its place.

On March 19, 1936, Webster served as a witness in Raleigh, alongside J.S. Carter and J.S. Doyle, at the execution of Jake Johnston, a black man who was charged with attacking an elderly white schoolteacher in Rockingham County in 1935.

Political career 

On November 3, 1942 Webster—receiving 241 votes from Madison—was elected as a member of the Democratic Party to the Rockingham County Board of Commissioners. In the late 1940s he worked on W. Kerr Scott's successful gubernatorial campaign. When Scott passed a large road construction project through the state legislature, Webster used his position as county commissioner to ensure that N.C. Highway 135 and Settle Bridge Road were paved. He remained on the Board of Commissioners until 1952.

Death 
Webster suffered a heart attack and died on May 24, 1965. He was buried at Centenary United Methodist Church in Stoneville, where he was a parishioner.

Legacy 

J.J. Webster's Store was run by Webster's family after his death. After his son, James Jefferson Webster II, died, the stock of the business was sold to a family friend in 1978. The brick store was closed on December 31, 1994 and soon thereafter demolished to make room for an expansion of N.C. Highway 135.

In May 1995 following the concurrence of Rockingham County's municipalities, the Board of Commissioners approved a resolution to dedicate N.C. Highway 135 in Webster's name. On July 7, 1995 at the recommendation of Douglas Galyon, the North Carolina Board of Transportation passed a resolution renaming the highway. A formal dedication ceremony took place at 11:00 A.M. on October 28, 1998 at Dalton L. McMichael High School.

References 

1898 births
1965 deaths
20th-century American politicians
American automobile salespeople
American merchants
American people of English descent
American United Methodists
Businesspeople from North Carolina
Businesspeople from Virginia
Businesspeople in the tobacco industry
County commissioners in North Carolina
Dairy farmers
Farmers from North Carolina
Farmers from Virginia
James
North Carolina Democrats
People from Patrick County, Virginia
People from Rockingham County, North Carolina
20th-century American businesspeople
20th-century Methodists